Köttelbeck is a small river of Lower Saxony, Germany. It flows into the Lutter near Eldingen.

See also
List of rivers of Lower Saxony

Rivers of Lower Saxony
Rivers of Germany